Yelena Konevtseva known by her full name Yelena Nikolayevna Konevtseva (born 11 March 1981 in Klin, Moscow Oblast) is a hammer thrower from Russia. Her personal best is 76.21 metres, achieved in May 2007 in Sochi.

She finished tenth at the 2000 World Junior Championships and fifth at the 2007 World Championships. In addition she competed at the 2002 European Athletics Championships, the 2003 World Championships, the 2004 Olympic Games and the 2008 Olympic Games without reaching the final.

International competitions

References

External links 

sports-reference

1981 births
Living people
People from Klin
Sportspeople from Moscow Oblast
Russian female hammer throwers
Olympic female hammer throwers
Olympic athletes of Russia
Athletes (track and field) at the 2004 Summer Olympics
Athletes (track and field) at the 2008 Summer Olympics
World Athletics Championships athletes for Russia
Russian Athletics Championships winners